Tornado Luxembourg is an ice hockey team in Luxembourg City. The team plays in FFHG Division 3. However, they are not eligible for the championship because they are a foreign team.

Tornado has also participated in the Luxembourg Championship, and the Luxembourg Cup.

History
Tornado Luxembourg debuted in the 1987-88 season, and played in the Rheinland-Palatinat Liga, a German regional league, which they won. They then finished second in the qualification round for the Regionalliga Mitte Group, and thus qualified for the 1988-89 season. They only played in the Regionalliga for the 1988-89 season, as they finished in eighth place in their group, and failed to qualify for the following season. 

Prior to 2005, the Tornado  played in the Rheinland-Palatinat Liga. Monique Scheier-Schneider negotiated with the French Ice Hockey Federation to get permission to play in the French Division 3. As part of the agreement, the team is eligible for promotion to the top Ligue Magnus tier, but are ineligible to become the French champion and represent France at international competitions for club teams. Schneider commented on the agreement by saying, "I think it's fair since we are already Luxembourg's champion by regularly beating our only competitor, the Beaufort club". Schneider has operated the Tornado as an amateur team which does not play its players, and covers its costs by a sponsorship from Škoda Auto.

In Luxembourg, the club won the Luxembourg Championship seven times between 1994 and 2003, and the Luxembourg Cup eight times; in 1994, 1996, 1997, 1999, 2003, 2007, 2011, and 2012.

During the 2012-2013 forward Colm Cannon became the all-time leading goal scorer of the Tornados.

With there being so few ice hockey players in Luxembourg, there are generally a number of players from Tornado on the national team. Eight players from Tornado Luxembourg played for the national team in 2009.

Roster

Forwards

Defence

Goaltenders

Results

Germany
Rheinland-Palatinat Liga
1986-87 1st place
1987-88 1st place
1989-1990: second place
1990-1991: fourth place
1991-1992: fourth place
1992-1993: second place
1997-1998: second place
1998-1999: second place
2001-2002: second place

France
FFHG Division 3
2007-2008: third place
2008-2009: third place in Group H
2009-2010: Carry off play-down tournament faced with Asnières 2.
2010-2011: seventh place in Group C

Luxembourg
Luxembourg Championship winners 2002-03, 2001-02, 2000-01, 1999-00, 1998-99, 1997-98, 1996-97, 1993-94
Luxembourg Cup winners 2012-13, 2011-12, 2006-07, 2002-03, 1998-99, 1996-97, 1995-95, 1993-94

References

External links
Official site
Ice hockey teams in Luxembourg
Ice hockey clubs established in 1987
1987 establishments in Luxembourg
Sport in Luxembourg City